Cassie Marie Berman (née Marrett) is an American musician. She was a member of the indie rock band Silver Jews, which was fronted by her husband David Berman. She contributed vocals and occasionally bass to the albums Bright Flight, Tanglewood Numbers, and Lookout Mountain, Lookout Sea. She also played bass and sang backup during live concerts. Berman appeared in the film Silver Jew, which chronicled the band's tour of the Middle East.

In addition, Berman also played bass on the Papa M album Hole of Burning Alms.

References

External links

 [ Cassie Marrett] entry at Allmusic
 [ Cassie Berman] entry at Allmusic

American indie rock musicians
Living people
Silver Jews members
Place of birth missing (living people)
Berman family
1975 births